Zacatula may refer to:

 Zacatula, Guerrero, a Mexican town in the municipality of La Unión de Isidoro Montes de Oca
 Zacatula (insect), a genus of insects in the family Tettigoniidae